The Martyrs of Otranto, also known as Saints Antonio Primaldo and his Companions, were 813 inhabitants of the Salentine city of Otranto in southern Italy who were killed on 14 August 1480 when the city fell to an Ottoman force under Gedik Ahmed Pasha. According to a traditional account, the killings took place after the Otrantins refused to convert to Islam.

Background
The Ottoman ambitions in Italy were ended. Had Otranto surrendered to the Turks, the history of Italy might have been very different. But the heroism of the people of Otranto was more than a strategically decisive stand. What made the sacrifice of Otranto so remarkable was the willingness to die for the faith rather than reject Christ.

The siege of Otranto – with the martyrdom of the inhabitants – was the last significant military attempt by a Muslim force to conquer southern Italy. The slaughter was remembered by historians of the Risorgimento (like Girolamo Arnaldi and Alfonso Scirocco) as a milestone in European history, because as a consequence of this sacrifice the Italian peninsula was never conquered by Muslim troops. The martyrs were presented as civic heroes representing the strength and fortitude of the Italian people.

History

On 28 July 1480 an Ottoman force commanded by Gedik Ahmed Pasha, consisting of 90 galleys, 40 galiots and other ships carrying a total of around 150 crew and 18,000 troops, landed beneath the walls of Otranto. The city strongly resisted the Ottoman assaults, but the garrison was unable to withstand the bombardment for long. The garrison and all the townsfolk thus abandoned the main part of the city on 29 July, retreating into the citadel whilst the Ottomans began bombarding the neighboring houses.

According to accounts of the story chronicled by Giovanni Laggetto and Saverio de Marco the Turks promised clemency if the city capitulated but were informed that Otranto would never surrender. A second Turkish messenger sent to repeat the offer "was slain with arrows and an Otranto guardsman flung the keys of the city into the sea". At this the Ottoman artillery resumed the bombardment.

A messenger was dispatched to beseech King Ferdinand of Naples for assistance, but most of the Aragonese militias were already committed in Tuscany. As time went on "Nearly seven-eighths (350) of Otranto's militia slipped over the city walls and fled." The remaining fifty soldiers fought alongside the citizenry dumping boiling oil and water on Turks trying to scale the ramparts between the cannonades.

The citadel fell, after a fifteen day siege, on August 12. When the walls were breached the Turks began fighting their way through the town. Upon reaching the cathedral "they found Archbishop Stefano Agricolo, fully vested and crucifix in hand" awaiting them with Count Francesco Largo. "The archbishop was beheaded before the altar, his companions were sawn in half, and their accompanying priests were all murdered." After desecrating the cathedral, they gathered the women and older children to be sold into Albanian slavery. Men over fifteen years old, small children, and infants, were slain.

According to some historical accounts, a total of 12,000 were killed and 5,000 enslaved, including victims from the territories of the Salentine peninsula around the city.

Eight hundred able-bodied men were told to convert to Islam or be slain. A tailor named Antonio Primaldi is said to have proclaimed "Now it is time for us to fight to save our souls for the Lord. And since he died on the cross for us, it is fitting that we should die for him." To which those captives with him gave a loud cheer.

On 14 August they were led to the Hill of Minerva (later renamed the Hill of Martyrs). There they were to be executed with Primaldi to be beheaded first. Witnessing this, one Muslim executioner (whom the chroniclers say was an Ottoman officer called Bersabei) is said to have converted on the spot and been impaled immediately by his fellows for doing so.

Between August and September 1480, King Ferdinand of Naples, with the help of his cousin Ferdinand the Catholic and the Kingdom of Sicily, tried unsuccessfully to recapture Otranto. 
Seeing the Turks as a threat to his home Alfonso of Aragon left his battles with the Florentines to lead a campaign to liberate Otranto from the Ottoman invaders beginning in August 1480. The city was finally retaken in the spring of 1481 by Alfonso's troops supported by King Matthias Corvinus of Hungary's forces. The skulls of the martyrs were placed in a reliquary in the city's cathedral.

Relics

On 13 October 1481 the bodies of the Otrantines were found to be uncorrupted and were transferred to the city's cathedral. From 1485, some of the martyrs' remains were transferred to Naples and placed under the altar of Our Lady of the Rosary in the church of Santa Caterina a Formiello – that altar commemorated the final Christian victory over the Ottomans at Lepanto in 1571. They were later moved to the reliquary chapel, consecrated by Benedict XIII, then to a site under the altar where they are now sited. A  between 2002 and 2003 confirmed their authenticity.

In 1930 Monsignor Cornelio Sebastiano Cuccarollo, O.F.M., was made archbishop of Otranto, and as a sign of affection and recognition to his old diocese he gave some of the relics to the Sanctuary of Santa Maria di Valleverde in Bovino, where he had been bishop from 1923 to 1930, where they are now in the crypt of the new basilica. Other relics of the martyrs are venerated in several locations in Apulia, particularly in Salento, and also in Naples, Venice and Spain.

Canonization
A canonical process began in 1539. On 14 December 1771 Pope Clement XIV beatified the 800 killed on the Colle della Minerva and authorised their veneration.

At the request of the archdiocese of Otranto, the process was resumed and confirmed in full the previous process. On 6 July 2007, Pope Benedict XVI issued a decree recognising that Primaldo and his fellow townsfolk were killed "out of hatred for their faith".  On 20 December 2012 Benedict gave a private audience to cardinal Angelo Amato, S.D.B., prefect of the Congregation for the Causes of Saints, in which he authorized the Congregation to promulgate a decree regarding the miracle of the healing of sister Francesca Levote, attributed to the intercession of the Blessed Antonio Primaldo and his Companions.

They were beatified in 1771 and their canonization date announced by Pope Benedict on 11 February 2013, the same day Benedict announced his intention to resign the papacy. They were canonised by Pope Francis on 12 May 2013.  They are the patron saints of the city of Otranto and the archdiocese of Otranto.

Commentary
The dead would have included both those who died during the fall of the city and in the aftermath of the siege, including residents of Otranto (which had a population of about 6,000) and people in the surrounding area. Various interpretations have been given of the events that led to their deaths. Some modern historians, such as Nancy Bisaha and Francesco Tateo have questioned details of the traditional account. Tateo notes that the earliest contemporary sources describe execution of up to one thousand soldiers or citizens, as well as the local bishop, but they do not mention conversion as a condition for clemency, nor is martyrdom mentioned in contemporary Italian diplomatic dispatches or Turkish chronicle. Bisaha argues that more of Otranto's inhabitants were likely to have been sold into slavery than slaughtered.

However, other historians, such as Paolo Ricciardi and Salvatore Panareo, have argued that in the first year after the martyrdom there were no information about the massacres in the contemporaneous Christian world and only later – when Otranto was reconquered by the Neapolitans – it was possible to get details of the massacre from the local survivors who saw it.

The contemporary Turkish historian Ibn Kemal indeed justified the slaughter on religious grounds. One modern study suggests it may have been a punitive measure, devoid of religious motivations, exacted to punish the local population for the stiff resistance they put up, which delayed the Turkish advance and enabled the King of Naples to strengthen local fortifications. Intimidation, a warning to other populations not to resist, may also have entered the invaders' calculations. 

After deciphering documents in the state archives at Modena, author Daniele Palma suggests the executions were the result of failed diplomacy. The records reference bank transfers and payment negotiations for captives following the siege of Otranto. With a typical ransom of 300 ducati (about three years’ worth of earnings for a normal family), Palma says that those killed were likely farmers, shepherds, and others too poor to raise the ransom.

See also
List of saints canonized by Pope Francis

References

Bibliography
 Paolo Ricciardi, Gli Eroi della Patria e i Martiri della Fede: Otranto 1480–1481, Vol. 1, Editrice Salentina, 2009
 Grazio Gianfreda, I beati 800 martiri di Otranto, Edizioni del Grifo, 2007
  Hervé Roullet, Les martyrs d'Otrante. Entre histoire et prophétie, Hervé Roullet, AVM Diffusion, Paray-le-Monial, France, 2019.

External links
http://www.santiebeati.it/dettaglio/90300
http://saints.sqpn.com/blessed-antony-primaldo/
https://web.archive.org/web/20131217224555/http://www.catholic.com/magazine/articles/how-the-800-martyrs-of-otranto-saved-rome
https://web.archive.org/web/20130212070047/http://www.romereports.com/palio/pope-will-announce-on-monday-date-for-canonization-for-over-800-saints-english-8965.html

1480 deaths
15th-century Roman Catholic martyrs
Martyred groups
Italian Roman Catholic saints
Groups of Christian martyrs of the Middle Ages
Christian saints killed by Muslims
Christians executed for refusing to convert to Islam
People from Otranto
Canonizations by Pope Francis
Beatifications by Pope Clement XIV